Muhammad Rio Saputro (born Jepara, 7 December 1995) is Indonesian professional footballer who plays as a centre-back.

Club career 
In the middle of season of 2016 Indonesia Soccer Championship B, Rio joined PSIS Semarang from rival club, Persijap Jepara. He play his debut against Persekap Pasuruan with score 3-1 for PSIS Semarang. Rio failed to bring PSIS Semarang a quarter final in 2016 but success send PSIS Semarang to Liga 1 Indonesia one year later.

Honours

Club
PSIS Semarang
 Liga 2 third place (play-offs): 2017

References

External links 
 Rio Saputro at Soccerway

1995 births
Living people
Indonesian footballers
Association football defenders
Liga 2 (Indonesia) players
Liga 1 (Indonesia) players
Persijap Jepara players
PSIS Semarang players
People from Jepara
Sportspeople from Central Java
Indonesia youth international footballers